Abracadabrella elegans is a species of jumping spider in the genus Abracadabrella. Its common name is Elegant Fly Mimic. It is common in coastal Eastern Australia, mostly Queensland. It appears to mimic a large fly with two black raised, rounded mounds on the rear of the abdomen, which look like eyes, and its spinnerets which resemble a fly's mouthparts. It walks backwards apparently to enhance the mimicry. Abracadabrella spp. are found on or under bark or on foliage from coastal north Queensland south to at least the central coast NSW.

It was first named Marptusa elegans by  L. Koch in 1879 when he described the female, then changed to Ocrisiona elegans by Simon in 1901. The genus name Abracadabrella  was created by Zabka in 1991 when he also described the male.

References

Salticidae
Arthropods of Queensland
Spiders of Australia
Spiders described in 1879